Le deuxième souffle may refer to:
 Le deuxième souffle (1966 film), directed by Jean-Pierre Melville
 Le deuxième souffle (2007 film), Alain Corneau's 2007 remake of the original 1966 film